Marco Antonio Ramos Esquivel (born 26 February 1987) is a Mexican professional basketball player, who plays the shooting guard and small forward positions for the Dorados de Chihuahua of the Liga Nacional de Baloncesto Profesional (LNBP). He also competes internationally for the national basketball team of Mexico, with which he participated at the 2014 FIBA Basketball World Cup.

FIBA COCABA Championship
FIBA COCABA Championship 2013 Gold Medal

References

External links
 RealGM profile
 Weber State Wildcats bio

1987 births
Living people
Basketball players at the 2015 Pan American Games
Basketball players from Michoacán
Forwards (basketball)
Junior college men's basketball players in the United States
Mexican men's basketball players
Mexican expatriate basketball people in the United States
Monterey Peninsula College alumni
Halcones Rojos Veracruz players
Toros de Nuevo Laredo players
Abejas de León players
Pan American Games competitors for Mexico
People from Zamora, Michoacán
Sportspeople from Salinas, California
Weber State Wildcats men's basketball players
2014 FIBA Basketball World Cup players